The second USS Pocomoke (SP-265), later YT-43, was a United States Navy minesweeper and tug commissioned in 1917 and sold in 1922.

Pocomoke was built as a civilian tug of the same name in 1902 at Pocomoke City, Maryland. The U.S. Navy purchased her from her owner, the Menhaden Products Company of Newport, Rhode Island, on 8 June 1917 for World War I service as a minesweeper. She was commissioned on 29 June 1917 as USS Pocomoke (SP-265).

During 1918 Pocomoke was assigned to the 2nd Naval District in southern New England. She operated off the United States West Coast and Mexico in 1919. On 17 July 1920 was classified as a district harbor tug and redesignated YT–43.

Pocomoke was sold at San Francisco, California, on 2 May 1922.

Pocomoke should not be confused with USS Pocomoke (SP-571), a patrol vessel also in commission during World War I.

References

NavSource Online: Service Ship Photo Archive USS Pocomoke (YT-43) ex USS Pocomoke (SP-265) (1917 - 1920)

Minesweepers of the United States Navy
Tugs of the United States Navy
World War I minesweepers of the United States
World War I auxiliary ships of the United States
Ships built in Pocomoke City, Maryland
1902 ships